Jagan is a 1984 Indian Telugu-language action film written and directed by Dasari Narayana Rao, produced by Vajjala Subba Rao and Vijaya Shankar under the banner of Lalithalaya Movies, starring Sobhan Babu, Jayasudha, Sumalatha and Jaggayya. The film was a box office bomb.

Cast 
 Sobhan Babu 
 Jayasudha 
 Sumalatha 
 Jaggayya
 Satyanarayana
 Gollapudi Maruti Rao 
 Allu Ramalingaiah 
 Peketi Sivaram
 Y. G. Mahendran
 Gokina Rama Rao
 Dr. Radha Krishna 
 K. R. Savitri
 Nirmalamma 
 Vijaya Lalitha
 Jayamalini

Soundtrack 
Soundtrack was composed by Chakravarthy.

Reference

External links 

Indian action films
1980s Telugu-language films
Films directed by Dasari Narayana Rao
Films scored by K. Chakravarthy
1984 action films
1984 films